The Khodynka Cup of Sorrows, also known as the Coronation Cup, the Sorrow Cup, or the Blood Cup, was made for the coronation of Tsar Nicholas II and Tsarina Alexandra Feodorovna in 1896. The cup bears the cyphers of Nicholas and Alexandra surrounded by a geometric pattern with the Romanov eagle on the opposite side.

The beaker is among many that were distributed along with food presents and commemorative scarves to celebrate the coronation of Nicholas II, as had been the long-standing tradition. On the morning of 18 May 1896, over half a million revelers gathered on the ragged Khodynka Field in Moscow in anticipation of the presents and especially the commemorative cups (enameled tableware was still a great novelty at the time). That was far more than the field could safely accommodate, especially considering the many trenches and pits that dotted the plain in front of the Tsar's podium, because the entire area was normally used as a military training ground. A rumor swept through the crowd that the cups contained a gold coin. In the confusion and crowd crush that ensued, over a thousand people were killed in what has become known as the Khodynka Tragedy. This event was taken as an omen of things to come for the rest of Nicholas' reign. The coronation cup became known in Russia as the Cup of Sorrows and the Tsar himself got the nickname of "Bloody Nicholas" – despite his best efforts to compensate the families of the victims. It was the Tsarina who named it the "cup of sorrows."

External links

1896 works
Drinkware
Nicholas II of Russia